Guy Halsall (born 1964) is an English historian and academic, specialising in Early Medieval Europe. He is currently based at the University of York, and has published a number of books, essays, and articles on the subject of early medieval history and archaeology. Halsall's current research focuses on western Europe in the important period of change around AD 600 and on the application of continental philosophy (especially the work of Jacques Derrida) to history. He taught at the University of Newcastle and Birkbeck, University of London, before moving to the University of York.

Life
Guy Halsall was born in North Ferriby in 1964 and raised in Worcestershire. He studied archaeology and history at the University of York, earning the first First-Class degree from York's archaeology department in 1986. He completed his D.Phil. at York in 1991 with a thesis on the "history and archaeology of the region of Metz in the Merovingian period" supervised by Edward James and examined by Steve Roskams and Bryan Ward-Perkins.

Career
In 1990 Halsall was awarded a postdoctoral research fellowship at the University of Newcastle. From 1991 to 2002 he was a permanent lecturer, and then reader, in early medieval history and archaeology at Birkbeck, University of London.  In 2003 he moved to the University of York, and was promoted to a professorship there in 2006.

In December 2012, Halsall briefly attracted attention in the Times Higher Education after a University of York student newspaper, Nouse, published an intemperate message he had sent to students enrolled on an undergraduate course, concerning non-attendance at lectures. 

In June 2013, Halsall was one of the signatories to an open letter criticising the proposed changes to the British history curriculum being implemented by Conservative Minister for Education Michael Gove. The letter expressed the opinion that the proposed reforms were "underpinned by an unbalanced promotion of partisan political views" in that they emphasised an Anglocentric "national triumphalism" and thus contravened the Education Acts of 1996 and 2002.

Halsall’s doctoral students have included the late antique historians Catherine-Rose Hailstone and James M. Harland.

Theories

Halsall disagrees strongly with a group of historians associated with the University of Oxford, among whom Peter Heather is a leading member. This group contends that Germanic tribes had more stable ethnic identities than previously assumed, and that the migrations of these peoples, facilitated by the expansion of the Huns, contributed significantly to the fall of the Western Roman Empire.  

Along with Walter Goffart, leader of the Toronto School of History, Halsall argues that the fall of the Western Roman Empire should be traced to internal developments within the empire itself, and that the barbarians were peacefully absorbed into Roman civilization, on which they had minimal influence. Halsall accuses Heather and his associates of leading a "counter-revisionist offensive against more subtle ways of thinking" in the field. He accuses them of "bizarre reasoning" and of purveying a "deeply irresponsible history". The result, says Halsall, has been "something of an academic counter-revolution", which has also spread to the field of archaeology. According to Halsall, "there can be no doubt that these works have — in the most generous interpretation — been written sufficiently carelessly as to provide succour to far-right extremists." Halsall identifies Anders Behring Breivik as one such extremist inspired by the works of the Oxford historians. Halsall traces these theories to Nazi influence, and fears that such theories may be used to strengthen racism and opposition to immigration. 

By rejecting the concept of a unifying Germanic culture, Halsall hopes that "the classic basis for nineteenth-century views of the German people as rooted in distant history" will be demolished. He considers it "fundamentally absurd" that Germanic peoples had anything in common beyond speaking Germanic languages. He consistently refers to the term Germanic in scare quotes, except in a linguistic sense. Halsall laments that there is still widespread agreement in the scholarly community that an early Germanic culture did indeed exist. He calls this "the problems of Germanism". He considers the belief in a common Celtic culture to be just as problematic as Germanism. He notes that the rejection of an early Germanic culture is "still far from generally accepted" and that "attempts to change this intellectually careless state of affairs are making only slow process." Nevertheless, Halsall admits that both Celts and Germanic peoples had a "a general overriding" identity, although in his view, this does not equate to "a higher level of ethnic identity".

Halsall contends that the Vienna School of History, although explicitly formed to combat Nazi influence in the study of Germanic peoples, has in fact based its theories upon Nazi theories, although this is not explicitly acknowledged by them. 

The increased reliance on archaeogenetics in recent years has in the eye of Halsall led to a flourishing of pseudoscience, which threatens to reduce the concept of ethnicity "to something close to the nineteenth-century idea of race." Proponents of archaeogenetics have in turn dismissed such worries by Halsall and others as being "ideological" objections and a form of political correctness. In response, Halsall admits that "the writing of history is inescapably political", and that his aim is to "provide a basis for a more politically and ethically responsible" history.

Works

Authored books

Worlds of Arthur: Facts and Fictions of the Dark Ages (Oxford: Oxford University Press, 2013)
Cemeteries and Society in Merovingian Gaul: Selected Studies in History and Archaeology, 1992-2009 (Leiden: E. J. Brill, 2010).
Barbarian Migrations and the Roman West, 376-568 (Cambridge: Cambridge University Press, 2007).
Warfare and Society in the Barbarian West, 450-900 (London: Routledge, 2003).
Early Medieval Cemeteries. An Introduction to Burial Archaeology in the Post-Roman West (Glasgow: Cruithne Press, 1995).
Settlement and Social Organization. The Merovingian Region of Metz (Cambridge: Cambridge University Press, 1995).

Edited books
(ed. with Wendy Davies and Andrew Reynolds) People and Space in the Middle Ages, 300–1300 (Turnhout: Brepols, 2006)
(ed.) Violence and Society in the Early Medieval West (Woodbridge: Boydell, 1998).
(ed.) Humour, History and Politics in Late Antiquity and the Early Middle Ages (Cambridge: Cambridge University Press, 2002).

Selected articles
'Nero and Herod? The death of Chilperic and Gregory of Tours' writing of history.' The World of Gregory of Tours, ed. K. Mitchell and I.N. Wood, (Brill; Leiden, 2002), pp. 337–50.
'Funny foreigners: Laughing with the barbarians in late antiquity.' Humour, History and Politics in Late Antiquity and the Early Middle Ages, ed. Halsall (see above), pp. 89–113.
'Childeric's grave, Clovis' succession and the origins of the Merovingian kingdom.' Society and Culture in Late Roman Gaul. Revisiting the Sources, ed. D. Shanzer & R. Mathisen (Aldershot, 2001), pp. 116–33.
'The Viking presence in England? The burial evidence reconsidered.' Cultures in Contact: Scandinavian Settlement in England in the Ninth and Tenth Centuries, ed. D.M. Hadley & J. Richards, (Brepols: Turnhout, 2000), pp. 259–76.
'Archaeology and the late Roman frontier in northern Gaul: The so-called Föderatengräber reconsidered.' Grenze und Differenz im früheren Mittelalter, ed. W. Pohl & H. Reimitz, (Österreichische Akadamie der Wissenschaften: Vienna, 2000), pp. 167–80.
'La Christianisation de la région de Metz à travers les sources archéologiques (5ème-7ème siècle): problèmes et possibilités.' L'Évangélisation des régions entre Meuse et Moselle et la Fondation de l'Abbaye d'Echternach (Ve-IXe siècle), ed. M. Polfer, (Linden: Luxembourg, 2000).
'Burial customs around the North Sea, c. AD 350–700.' Kings of the North Sea, AD 250–850, ed. E. Kramer, I. Stoumann & A. Greg (Newcastle, 2000), pp. 93–104.
'Review Article: Movers and Shakers: The Barbarians and the Fall of Rome.' Early Medieval Europe 8.1 (1999), pp. 131–45.
'Reflections on Early Medieval Violence: The example of the "Blood Feud".' Memoria y Civilización 2 (1999), pp. 7–29.
'Social identities and social relationships in Merovingian Gaul.' Franks and Alamanni in the Merovingian Period: An Ethnographic Perspective, ed. I.N. Wood, (Boydell: Woodbridge, 1998), pp. 141–65.
'Burial, ritual and Merovingian society.' The Community, the Family and the Saint: Patterns of Power in Early Medieval Europe, ed. J. Hill & M. Swan, (Brepols: Turnhout, 1998), pp. 325–38.
'Violence and society in the early medieval west: An introductory survey.' Violence and Society in the Early Medieval West, ed. Halsall, (see above), pp. 1–45.
'Archaeology and Historiography.' The Routledge Companion to Historiography, ed. M. Bentley, (Routledge: London, 1997), pp. 807–29.
'Female status and power in early Merovingian central Austrasia: the burial evidence.' Early Medieval Europe 5.1 (1996), pp. 1–24.
'Towns, societies and ideas: The not-so-strange case of late Roman and early Merovingian Metz.' Towns in Transition. Urban Evolution in Late Antiquity and the Early Middle Ages, ed. N. Christie & S.T. Loseby (Scolar: Aldershot, 1996), pp. 235–261.
'Playing by whose rules? A further look at Viking atrocity in the ninth century.' Medieval History vol.2, no.2 (1992), pp. 3–12.
'The origins of the Reihengräberzivilisation: Forty years on.' Fifth-Century Gaul: A Crisis of Identity? ed. J.F. Drinkwater & H. Elton, (C.U.P.: Cambridge, 1992), pp. 196–207.

Notes

References

Sources

External links
 

1964 births
English historians
Living people
People from North Ferriby
Anglo-Saxon studies scholars
Academics of the University of York